Kamphaeng Phet may refer to
Kamphaeng Phet, town in central Thailand
Kamphaeng Phet, Rattaphum a tambon in Rattaphum District, Songkhla Province, Thailand
Kamphaeng Phet Province
Amphoe Mueang Kamphaeng Phet
Kamphaeng Phet Historical Park
Kamphaeng Phet Road, Bangkok
Kamphaeng Phet metro station, Bangkok
Prince Purachatra Jayakara, Prince of Kamphaeng Phet (1882-1936)